Puthen Kovilakam is one section of the Kodungallur Kovilakam, a palace in Kodungallur, Kerala, India. Puthen Kovilakam means "new palace". This Kovilakam (manor house) was known by the name "Gurukulam". It was a well-known learning center. Many eminent scholars from this Kovilakam contributed to Malayalam and Sanskrit literature.

References

Palaces in Thrissur
Buildings and structures in Thrissur district